Tata Nagar Railway Colony is an Out growth in the Golmuri-cum-Jugsalai CD block in the Dhalbhum subdivision of the Purbi Singhbhum district in the Indian state of Jharkhand.

Geography

Location                         

Jamshedpur Urban Agglomeration 
With its recognition as an industrial town as early as the 1911 census, Jamshedpur was set on the road of steady population growth, as large number of emigrants flocked in for work opportunities. While in the earlier decades the central nucleus grew, in the later decades towns around Jamshedpur grew rapidly. In 2011, Jamshedpur Urban Agglomeration included 13 urban centres, with a total population of 1.3 million people. However, in more recent years, Jamshedpur UA "has lacked the growth and development observed around other similar industrial towns in western and southern India." 

Note: The map alongside presents the Jamshedpur Urban Agglomeration. All places marked in the map are linked in the larger full screen map.

Demographics 
According to the 2011 Census of India, Tata Nagar Railway Colony had a total population of 45,986, of which 24,376 (53%) were males and 21,610 (47%) were females. Population in the age range 0-6 years was 6,250. The total number of literate persons in Tata Nagar Railway Colony was 31,508 (79.29% of the population over 6 years). 

(*For language details see Golmuri-cum-Jugsalai block#Language and religion) 

Jamshedpur Urban Agglomeration includes: Jamshedpur (Industrial Town), Jamshedpur (NAC), Tata Nagar Railway Colony (OG), Mango (NAC),  Jugsalai (M), Bagbera (CT), Chhota Gobindpur (CT), Haludbani (CT), Sarjamda (CT), Gadhra (CT), Ghorabandha (CT), Purihasa (CT), Adityapur (M Corp.), Chota Gamahria (CT) and Kapali (CT).

References 
 

 

Cities and towns in East Singhbhum district 
Neighbourhoods in Jamshedpur